Dan Ostermiller (born 1956 in Cheyenne, Wyoming) is an American sculptor best known for his depictions of animals. , he is president of the National Sculpture Society. He resides in Loveland, Colorado.

Works
Ostermiller's works are on display in numerous public venues, for example:

National Museum of Wildlife Art
Wyoming State Capitol
Grand Teton National Park
Denver Art Museum – Scottish Angus Cow and Calf pieces together weigh over 
Public art in Kirkland, Washington
Powell Gardens Kansas City's botanical garden, near Kingsville, Missouri
Eagle Creek Park, Indianapolis

References

Further reading

20th-century American sculptors
People from Cheyenne, Wyoming
People from Loveland, Colorado
1956 births
Living people
21st-century American sculptors